Alexios Mosele, sometimes also Musele or Mousele (Μουσηλέ), may refer to:

 Alexios Mosele (general), Byzantine general under Emperor Constantine VI
 Alexios Mosele (Caesar), son-in-law of Byzantine Emperor Theophilos
 Alexios Mosele (admiral) (died 922), Byzantine admiral under Romanos I